Guitar on the Go is an album by American jazz guitarist Wes Montgomery that released in 1966. It includes tracks recorded in 1959 and October and November 1963. The album was Montgomery's last for Riverside before signing with Verve.

Guitar on the Go was reissued in the Original Jazz Classics series with an additional take of "The Way You Look Tonight" and the bonus track "Unidentified Solo Guitar".

Reception 

Jazz critic Scott Yanow called the release "a worthy if not essential addition to Wes Montgomery's discography" and, due to his later change of style to a more pop-oriented approach, "the end of an era."

Track listing
"The Way You Look Tonight" [Alternate take] (Jerome Kern, Dorothy Fields) – 5:48
"The Way You Look Tonight" (Kern, Fields) – 9:08
"Dreamsville" (Ray Evans, Jay Livingston, Henry Mancini) – 3:48
"Geno" (Wes Montgomery) – 2:53
"Missile Blues" (Montgomery) – 5:57
"For All We Know" (J. Fred Coots, Sam M. Lewis) – 4:29
"Fried Pies" (Montgomery) – 6:41
"Mi Cosa (Take 1)" (Montgomery) – 3:37

Personnel
 Wes Montgomery – guitar
 Melvin Rhyne – organ
 George Brown – drums (1-4, 6)
 Jimmy Cobb – drums (7)
 Paul Parker – drums (5)
Production notes:
 Orrin Keepnews – producer

References

External links
Jazz Discography

1963 albums
Wes Montgomery albums
Albums produced by Orrin Keepnews
Riverside Records albums